Sotiris Trivizas (b. Corfu 1960) is a Greek poet, essayist and translator. He read Philology and journalism in Thessaloniki. He is a member of the Porfiras literary magazine editorial board.

Works

Poetry
Το κέλυφος (The Shell), 1982
Κίβδηλο φεγγάρι (False Moon), 1984
Βίος Ασωμάτων και άλλα ποιήματα (Life of the bodiless and other poems), 1991

Essays
Το σουρρεαλιστικό σκάνδαλο. Χρονικό της υποδοχής του υπερρεαλιστικού κινήματος στην Ελλάδα (The Surrealist Scandal. Chronicle of the reception of the surrealist movement in Greece), 1996
Το πνεύμα του λόγου (The spirit of reason), 2000

Selected Translations
Pirandello, Luigi, Χάος (Chaos) 1996
Pavese, Cesare, O θάνατος θα 'ρθει και θα 'χει τα μάτια σου (Verrà la morte ed avrà i tuoi occhi), 1997
Ungaretti, Giuseppe, Σπουδή θανάτου, 1998

Anthologies
Ποιητές του Μεσοπολέμου (Interwar Poets), 1997
Nαπολέων Λαπαθιώτης. Μια παρουσίαση (Napoleon Lapathiotis: a presentation), 2000

External links
His page at the website of the Hellenic Authors' Society (Greek) and (English)

Notes

1960 births
Greek essayists
20th-century Greek poets
Living people
Greek male poets
20th-century essayists
20th-century Greek male writers